3 Ninjas is a series of action comedy family films about the adventures of three young brothers who are trained by their Japanese grandfather in the art of Ninjutsu. Victor Wong is the only cast member to appear in all four films.

Characters 
Samuel "Rocky" Douglas Jr. — portrayed by Michael Treanor (3 Ninjas and 3 Ninjas Knuckle Up), Sean Fox (3 Ninjas Kick Back), and Matthew Bothuchis
Born 1979 and 1984, the eldest brother. Grandpa gives him the ninja name "Rocky" because he is as strong as granite and is a level-headed leader. His trademark color is green. 

Jeffrey "Colt" Douglas — portrayed by Max Elliott Slade and Michael O’Laskey II
Born 1980 and 1985, the middle child. Grandpa gave him the ninja name "Colt" because he is "fast and free like the young wild horse". He is known for his shorter temper and sharp tongue. His trademark color is blue.

Michael "Tum-Tum" Douglas
Born 1984 and 1989, the youngest brother. Known for his large appetite and fondness for sweets. His trademark colors have been yellow, orange, and red.

Films

3 Ninjas (1992)

Each summer, Samuel, Jeffrey and Michael, three suburban California brothers, visit their grandfather Mori Tanaka's cabin in the desert to train to become ninjas. On their last day of summer vacation, the boys receive "ninja names": Samuel is Rocky because of his strength and levelheaded mentality, Jeffrey is Colt because of his speed and temper like a young wild horse, and Michael is Tum Tum due to his energy coming from his gluttony. They witness a confrontation between their grandfather and Hugo Snyder, ex-student/partner of Tanaka and a criminal who is being pursued by the boys' father, FBI agent Sam Douglas. Snyder plans to kidnap the boys with the help of his assistant Mr. Brown, who employs his irresponsible nephew Fester, and his friends Hammer and Marcus to abduct them. After a failed attempt at kidnapping foiled by the three boys outsmarting the three men while their parents are out, Mr. Brown along with heavyweight fighter "Rushmore" appear and they easily capture the trio, leaving a note with Rocky's girlfriend Emily, telling Sam that Snyder has kidnapped his children in retaliation for his constant attempts to arrest him. Mori arrives at the house and Sam reluctantly agrees to give him one hour to rescue the children. Mori tracks the children to a ship at the docks where Snyder is training an army of ninjas and begins searching for the boys and Snyder. Meanwhile, the boys escape their containment cell using the training bestowed upon them by their Grandfather and begin fighting their way out of the ship, leading up to a final confrontation between Snyder and Mori. Mori wins, despite Snyder's foul play and Sam ambushes the ship with a slew of FBI agents, wounding Snyder and foiling his evil organization.

3 Ninjas Knuckle Up (1993)

Rocky, Colt and Tum Tum must battle an evil, wealthy toxic waste dumper in order to save a local Indian tribe and their friend Jo. The 3 Ninjas must help find Jo's father and find a secret disk that contains evidence that could stop the toxic landfill that is destroying the Indian community. However, the town is owned by the wealthy toxic waste dumper, and he controls the police and the mayor. The 3 Ninjas must fight a motorcycle gang and renegade cowboys, retrieve the secret disk and expose the wealthy baron of his misdeeds.

3 Ninjas Kick Back (1994)

Rocky, Colt and Tum Tum are torn between seeing a championship baseball game through to the end or going to Japan to deliver a golden dagger to their grandfather; they choose the latter. On the way to Japan, they meet Miyo, a girl who Rocky is very fond of. When Koga gets the dagger and sword, he tries to open the cave of gold. Koga and Mori become friends and Miyo gets the dagger. During their Japanese adventure, the kids learn important skills and life lessons which help them win the final baseball game of their season, with Colt hitting a home run. A poor sport on the opposing team picks on them; he attempts to attack Miyo but ends up getting knocked unconscious during one of the final scenes.

3 Ninjas: High Noon at Mega Mountain (1998)

Rocky, Colt and Tum Tumalong with their neighbor friend, computer whiz Amandaare visiting Mega Mountain amusement park when it is invaded by an army of ninjas led by master criminal Mary Ann "Medusa" Rogers. The boys have to thwart Medusa's vicious plans and liberate Mega Mountain.

Cast and crew

Cast

Reception

Box office performance
The first 3 Ninjas film was a box office success and was the only entry in the franchise to be released by Disney, through its Touchstone Pictures label. The rights to the franchise were subsequently acquired by Tristar Pictures, which released the three sequels, all of which were box office bombs. The first film developed a cult following and was released on DVD on June 3, 2003.

Critical response

References

 
American film series
Fictional trios
Film series introduced in 1992
Ninja films
TriStar Pictures franchises
1990s English-language films
1990s American films